Under a Pale Grey Sky is a live album by Sepultura, released on September 24, 2002, through Roadrunner Records. The album was recorded in the Brixton Academy, London on December 16, 1996. Max Cavalera left Sepultura shortly after the concert, following an argument with his band mates outside the band's touring bus.

The two other bands performing on that same night were Strife and Floodgate.

Album information
The album was released by Roadrunner Records after dropping Sepultura from the label. The current band do not list the album as part of their discography. The set list for the show sees the band play the majority of that year's Roots album, as well as the most popular songs from their previous albums. The title of the album is a lyric in the title track from the band's fourth album Arise.

Track listing

Disc one

Disc two

Credits
Sepultura
Max Cavalera – lead vocals, rhythm guitar
Andreas Kisser – lead guitar, backing vocals
Paulo Jr. – bass
Igor Cavalera – drums, percussion
Additional personnel
Rick Rodney (Strife) – vocals (on "We Gotta Know")
Colin Richardson – mixing

Charts

References

2002 live albums
Sepultura live albums
Roadrunner Records live albums
Albums recorded at the Brixton Academy